Wakefield Bus Station serves the city of Wakefield, West Yorkshire, England. The bus station is owned and operated by Arriva Yorkshire. It is situated at next to Marsh Way A61 and the city's new market and can be accessed from both Marsh Way and Union Street. It reopened on 25 September 2001 after being rebuilt with a main passenger concourse and 24 bus stands.

Facilities 
The bus station has 24 stances.

Services
The main operators at the bus station are Arriva Yorkshire, Team Pennine, Stagecoach Yorkshire and National Express coach services also running nationwide from Wakefield.

Buses run from the bus station around the Wakefield area and to the nearby towns and cities of Barnsley, Dewsbury, Leeds, Bradford, Huddersfield and Holmfirth.

The Wakefield freecitybus, operated by Tetley's connects the bus station with both the Wakefield Westgate and Kirkgate railway stations, as well as The Ridings Centre.

See also

 Wakefield Westgate railway station
 Wakefield Kirkgate railway station

References

External links
 Wakefield Bus Station experience Wakefield Yorkshire 
 Metro's (West Yorkshire PTE) Wakefield Bus Station page

Bus stations in West Yorkshire
Buildings and structures in Wakefield